Winter Hours is the debut full-length studio album from American metal band Tombs, released on February 17, 2009, through Relapse Records in CD, LP and digital download formats.

Track listing

Personnel
Tombs
 Mike Hill - vocals, guitar
 Carson Daniel James - bass
 Justin Ennis - drums
Production
 Mike Hill - production
 Alan Douches - mastering
 Ian Whalen - audio engineering, mixing
 John Chambers - engineering
Art
 Thomas Hooper - album artwork

External links

 2009 BrooklynVegan interview with Mike Hill

References

2009 albums
Relapse Records albums
Tombs (band) albums